The 2000 United States presidential election in Pennsylvania took place on November 7, 2000, and was part of the 2000 United States presidential election. Voters chose 23 representatives, or electors to the Electoral College, who voted for president and vice president.

Pennsylvania was won by Vice President Al Gore by a 4.17% margin of victory. However, voter enthusiasm for both candidates was generally low throughout the campaign. Gore failed to capture Clinton's appeal in strongly Democratic regions such as Pittsburgh and Scranton, and thus carried these areas by a smaller number than his predecessor. However, opposition to George W. Bush was particularly strong in the suburban counties of Philadelphia; although these areas at the time were typically Republican leaning, they featured a strong culturally liberal bent, and thus Bush was unable to appeal to voters. Bush support was particularly strong in rural, central Pennsylvania, where the Texas Governor appealed to Evangelical voters and where Gore's connection to gun control policies was strongly rejected. Marginal wins in both of the state's metropolitan areas helped the Vice President to capture the state. This was the first election since 1968 that the candidate who won Pennsylvania did not win the general election, and only the fourth time that has happened since 1916. , this is the last election in which Greene County, Mercer County, and Lawrence County voted for the Democratic candidate.

Bush became the first Republican ever to win the White House without carrying Delaware County, the first to win the White House without carrying Montgomery County since Rutherford B. Hayes in 1876, the first to win the White House without carrying Bucks County – which he had lost by precisely the same margin he had lost the state as a whole – since Benjamin Harrison in 1888, and the first to win the White House without carrying Lehigh County since William McKinley in 1900.

Primaries

Democratic Primary
The Democratic primary was held on April 4th. There were 191 delegates at stake, with 160 pledged and 31 unpledged. Vice President Al Gore won 139 pledged and the support of 28 unpledged while U.S. Senator Bill Bradley won 21 pledged.

Republican Primary
The Republican primary was held on April 4th. There were 78 delegates at stake, with 68 district delegates being decided in the primary and 10 statewide delegates being decided at the state committee meeting in May. While all delegates were technically unbound, Texas Governor George W. Bush won the support of all 78 delegates.

Results

By county

Counties that flipped from Democratic to Republican
Armstrong (Largest city: Kittanning)
Centre (Largest city: State College)
Clinton (Largest city: Lock Haven)
Columbia (Largest city: Bloomsburg)
Elk (Largest city: St. Marys)
Forest (Largest city: Marienville)
Indiana (Largest city: Indiana)
Schuylkill (Largest city: Pottsville)
Warren (Largest city: Warren)
Westmoreland (Largest township: Hempfield Township)

By congressional district
Gore won 11 of 21 congressional districts. Gore won three that elected Republicans while Bush won two that elected Democrats.

Electors

The electors of each state and the District of Columbia met on December 18, 2000 to cast their votes for president and vice president. The Electoral College itself never meets as one body. Instead the electors from each state and the District of Columbia met in their respective capitols.

The following were the members of the Electoral College from the state. All were pledged to and voted for Al Gore and Joe Lieberman:
Kathy Black
Richard W. Bloomingdale
Robert P. Casey Jr.
Nelson Diaz
William M. George
Ken Jarin
James J. Johnston
Edward Keller
Robert Mellow
Thomas J. Murphy, Jr.
Elsa Favila
Robert O'Connor
Lazar M. Palnick
Stephen R. Reed
T. J. Rooney
Joyce Savocchio
John F. Street
Patsy J. Tallarico
Christine M. Tartaglione
Margaret M. Tartaglione
Marian Tasco
Sala Udin
Anna Verna

See also
 List of United States presidential elections in Pennsylvania

References

Pennsylvania
2000
United States President